LNDN DRGS (disemvoweling of "London Drugs") is a duo made up of Jay Worthy and producer Sean House. As of 2019, they have been primarily releasing projects through their GDF Records imprint.

History 

Jay made his debut appearance in 2016 at Boiler Room in L.A. and toured across America in 2018, appearing alongside Freddie Gibbs and other artists.

LNDN DRGS has released collaborative projects with rappers Curren$y, Left Brain, and King Most, and with producers A$AP P On The Boards and The Alchemist.

The duo released a collaborative compilation entitled: 'Affiliated' in 2019.

In 2020/21 Jay Worthy released 2 solo projects and LNDN DRGS dropped the album Burnout 4. Jay Worthy has also made guest appearances on albums by Larry June, Isaiah Rashad, Westside Gunn and Jim Jones.

Discography 
Albums
 Aktive – EP (2015)
 Fantasy Island – EP with The Alchemist (2017)
 Westside Party – EP with King Most (2018)
 P ON the DRGS with P On The Boards (2017)
 Aktive Deluxe (2018)
 Brain on DRGS with Left Brain (2018)
 Umbrella Symphony with Currensy (2019)
 Affiliated (2020)
 Burnout 4 (2020)

Jay Worthy solo
 Two4One (2019)
 Eat When You're Hungry, Sleep When You're Tired with Harry Fraud (2020)
 Till The Morning with Shlohmo (2020)
 No Sleep for the Wicked with Sha-Hef (2021)
 The Ballad of a Dopehead with T.F. & Budgie (2021)
 Two4Two (2021)
 2 P'z in a Pod with Larry June (2022)
 You Take the Credit, We'll Take the Check with Harry Fraud (2022)
 What They Hittin 4 with DJ Muggs (2022)

References

External links 
 

 
 

American hip hop groups